Isolytic contraction is when a muscle contracts while external forces cause it to lengthen.   For example, during a controlled lowering of the weight in a biceps curl, the biceps are undergoing isolytic contraction.  In osteopathic manipulative medicine, it is used for the treatment of fibrotic or chronically shortened myofascial tissues.  The applied counterforce is greater than the patient force, resulting in lengthening of the myofascial tissues.

References 

Physical therapy